DXSC (819 AM) was a radio station owned and operated by Southern Philippines Mass Communication. Its studios were located inside the 4CRG Compound, Camp General Basilio Navarro, Brgy. Upper Calarian, Zamboanga City.

It was formerly owned by UM Broadcasting Network as DXRC in Malaybalay from 1965 to 1972, when it closed down during Martial Law. Its equipment were donated to AFP Southern Command in Zamboanga City the following year, and began its operations as DXSC. On September 10, 2005, it transferred its operations to FM.

References

Radio stations in Zamboanga City
Radio stations established in 1965
Radio stations disestablished in 2005
Department of National Defense (Philippines)
Defunct radio stations in the Philippines